Tikal Temple IV is a Mesoamerican pyramid in the ruins of the ancient Maya city of Tikal in modern Guatemala. It was one of the tallest and most voluminous buildings in the Maya world. The pyramid was built around 741 AD. Temple IV is located at the western edge of the site core. Two causeways meet at the temple; the Tozzer Causeway runs east to the Great Plaza, while the Maudslay Causeway runs northeast to the Northern Zone. Temple IV is the second tallest pre-Columbian structure still standing in the New World, just after the Great Pyramid of Toniná in Chiapas, Mexico, although Teotihuacan's Pyramid of the Sun may once have been taller.

The pyramid was built to mark the reign of the 27th king of the Tikal dynasty, Yik'in Chan K'awiil, although it may have been built after his death as his funerary temple. Archaeologists believe that Yik'in Chan K'awiil's tomb lies undiscovered somewhere underneath the temple. The summit shrine faces eastward to the site core, with Temple III visible directly in front and Temple I and Temple II beyond it.

The structure

The pyramid has a rectangular base with its long axis running north–south. It stands  from its supporting platform to the highest part of the roof comb. Archaeologists estimate that  of construction material were utilised in the bulk of the pyramid. The temple faces eastwards towards the site core and supports a massive roof comb in pure Petén style, which was built upon the highest part of the structure's rear. It was hollow and was faced with an enormous mosaic sculpture. The architecture of Temple IV is broadly similar to that of the other major temples at Tikal, such as Temple I and Temple II.

The pyramid body itself, excluding the superstructure, consists of seven stepped levels with slanting talud walls and multiple corners. The lowest of these levels measures , whilst the uppermost platform measures . The supporting platform was of very high-quality and utilised enormous stones in its construction.

The shrine was built upon a platform resting upon a supplementary platform, which was in turn seated upon the top of the pyramid.

The supplementary platform measures  with the longer axis running north–south. A stairway projects eastwards from this, giving access to the shrine itself. The supplementary platform is not exactly rectangular but consists of a number of architectural elements forming a complex plan.

The massive bulk of the roof comb was lightened by internal chambers, with four being built into each of the three levels. The roof comb was originally somewhat taller as evidenced by the bases of three smaller architectural elements on top.

The shrine
The shrine measures , with a maximum height of  excluding the roof comb. The exterior walls of the shrine are vertical, contrasting with the rest of the pyramid. The upper sections of the exterior walls formed a frieze, with three giant stone mosaic masks facing eastwards over the temple access. The central mask was directly over the outer doorway, while the other two were near the northern and southern extremes of the building's facade.

The shrine had three chambers situated one behind the other, each linked by a doorway with a lintel fashioned from sapodilla wood. These three rooms were the only accessible chambers in the entire pyramid temple. The lintel of the exterior doorway was plain but the two interior lintels were intricately carved. These two were removed in 1877 by Gustav Bernoulli and are now found in the Ethnographic Museum in Basel in Switzerland. The lintels were carved elsewhere and then moved to the pyramid, raised to the summit shrine and installed in prepared positions; this was a laborious task given that sapodilla wood weighs 1120 kg/m3 (69.1 lb/cubic foot). It was only after the installation of the lintels that the shrine was roofed and the roof comb built.

The hieroglyphic inscriptions on the sculpted lintels indicate that the temple was built in 741 AD, and radiocarbon dating of the lintels and wooden beams in the vaulting confirmed this, giving a result of 720±60 AD.

Lintel 3 is a wooden panel measuring  that is carved in low relief. It depicts the Tikal king Yik'in Chan K'awiil seated on a litter underneath the arch of a celestial serpent. The lintel was sculpted to mark his victory over the city of El Perú in 743. It has two panels of hieroglyphic script, containing a total of 64 glyphs.

Modern history
The Tikal Project of the University of Pennsylvania stabilised the ruins of the pyramid between 1964 and 1969, carrying out some limited restoration work to the upper part of the temple. The National Tikal Project (Proyecto Nacional Tikal) carried out emergency repairs in the second half of the 1970s.

Gallery

See also
Tikal Temple V
List of tallest structures built before the 20th century

Notes

References

Further reading

 

Tikal
Maya architecture
Pyramids in Guatemala
Buildings and structures completed in the 8th century
8th century in Guatemala
8th-century establishments in the Maya civilization